Tricia Leigh Fisher is an American actress and singer.

Early life 
Fisher was born to singer Eddie Fisher and actress Connie Stevens. Her older sister is actress and singer Joely Fisher. She has two half-siblings, actor and producer Todd Fisher and actress Carrie Fisher, from her father's previous marriage to actress Debbie Reynolds. Fisher's paternal grandparents were Russian-Jewish immigrants. Fisher's parents divorced when she was a baby and she and Joely were raised by Stevens. As children, both Tricia and Joely began performing on stage in their mother's Las Vegas show. They toured the world with their mother, attending many different schools and having tutors. Both girls also attended Beverly Hills High School.

Career

Acting 
Fisher made her debut in the 1985 crime drama Stick, starring Burt Reynolds, Candice Bergen, George Segal, and Charles Durning. She then starred as Daphne Ziegler in the 1986 comedy Pretty Smart. In 1987, Fisher appeared in the television movie Strange Voices, opposite Valerie Harper. The following year, she landed a role in the TV movie Bring Me the Head of Dobie Gillis, also starring her mother as well as Dwayne Hickman and Bob Denver. In 1989, Fisher appeared in two movies, Hollywood Chaos and C.H.U.D. II: Bud the C.H.U.D., followed by roles in the 1990 comedy, Book of Love and Arizona Dream starring Johnny Depp, Jerry Lewis, and Faye Dunaway.

In addition to Fisher's work in movies, she has also made guest appearances on Our House, Growing Pains, Ellen, Wild Card, 7th Heaven, and 'Til Death. In 1996, she portrayed Heidi Fleiss in the CBS television movie The Making of a Hollywood Madam.

On October 7, 2006, Fisher was honored at The Thalians 51st Anniversary Ball along with producer Marc Cherry, her mother Connie Stevens, and her sister Joely Fisher. They performed together at the event at the Hyatt Regency Century Plaza Hotel in Century City, California.

In September 2011, Fisher and her husband, actor Byron Thames, appeared in her mother's Las Vegas stage show. In July 2012, Fisher, her husband and children began appearing on the ABC Family reality series Beverly Hills Nannies.

Music 
Fisher performed the theme song for her 1986 movie Pretty Smart, and released a self-titled debut album for Atco Records in 1990. The album's single "Empty Beach", written by Dennis East, was a modest hit.

Filmography

Discography

Albums 

 1990: Tricia Leigh Fisher
 1990: Dreams‡

Singles 

 1990: "Empty Beach"
 1990: "Let's Make the Time"
 1990: "My Heart Holds On"/"Good As Gold"‡

 ‡ Japan release only

References

External links 
 
 
 
 

20th-century American actresses
21st-century American actresses
American child actresses
American dance musicians
American film actresses
American women pop singers
American people of Italian descent
American people of Russian-Jewish descent
American television actresses
Living people
Participants in American reality television series
Singers from California
Atco Records artists
Beverly Hills High School alumni
Year of birth missing (living people)